Agnes Lum (born May 21, 1956) is an American former model and singer who gained popularity in Japan in the late 1970s and early 1980s. In order to avoid confusion with Agnes Chan, another popular idol at the time, "Lum-chan" was used, though many fans called both "Agnes". Lum has appeared in numerous calendars, on posters, and magazine spreads, and these items regularly fetch high prices in the collectors' market.

History
Lum was born to a Chinese father and a Native Hawaiian mother.  While attending Kailua High School, Lum worked as a model and became well-known in Hawaii. She was named Miss Hawaii USA in 1974, but the title was revoked because she was too young to compete in the contest. Lum became an overnight success in Japan after becoming the first Clarion Girl in 1975, hired to promote Clarion products in a television and print advertising campaign.

In 1976, she released her first single, titled Downtown After the Rain. That same year, she made her debut appearance on NHK's Kōhaku Uta Gassen variety show. In 1996, Lum appeared, along with her twin sons, in a television commercial for the Daihatsu Pyzar.

The 12.20.2011 "Super Lucky" edition of Weekly Playboy features Lum. She has appeared on the cover of the publication six times.

Public image

At that time, she was nicknamed "Lum-chan" in Japan, though now that nickname can be confused with that of the fictional character Lum from Urusei Yatsura.  Lum was the inspiration for the name of this character as she was well known at the time the manga was first released (1978).

Discography

Singles

Keisuke Yamagawa (lyrics), Yūzō Kayama (composition)
Reached 79 on the Oricon charts

Mayo Shōno (lyrics), Masami Koizumi (composition)

Albums

With Love
I Am Agnes Lum

Books
Listed chronologically, with newest at bottom.
Agnes Lum, ¥2500, 2000, KK Bestsellers, 82 pages
, Kenji Nagatomo and Miho Osada, ¥840, 2007, Chuokoron Shinsha

Sources:

References

External links
 Agneslum.com (archived at Internet Archive) (Italian fan website)

1956 births
Native Hawaiian actresses
American female models
American expatriates in Japan
Actresses from Honolulu
American people of Native Hawaiian descent
American women singers
American musicians of Chinese descent
Japanese gravure models
Living people
Musicians from Honolulu
American beauty pageant winners
American models of Chinese descent
21st-century American women